Bassam Talhouni (born 1964) is a Jordanian lawyer, academic and politician. He served as industry minister. Between August 2013 and September 2016 he was minister of justice.

Talhouni  served as minister of justice in Bisher Al-Khasawneh's cabinet. He resigned with Samir Mobeideen on 28 February 2021 due to breaking lockdown in the COVID-19 pandemic in Jordan.

Early life and education
Talhouni was born in Amman in 1964. He received a bachelor's degree and a master's degree in law from the University of Jordan. He also holds a PhD in law from the University of Edinburgh which he obtained in 1997.

Career
Talhouni registered at the Jordan Bar Association in 1988 and owns a law firm in Amman. He was assistant professor at the University of Jordan's law faculty. He served as a member in the legislation and justice branch within the national agenda committee and companies' comptroller. He is a member of the Arab Society for Intellectual Property (ASIP).

In August 2013, he was appointed justice minister to the cabinet led by Prime Minister Abdullah Ensour. He stayed on in Hani Al-Mulki's cabinet presented in June 2016. He lost his position in the cabinet reshuffle on 29 September 2016, and was replaced by Awad Mashagbeh. Talhouni was subsequently appointed to the Senate.

References

1964 births
Living people
University of Jordan alumni
Alumni of the University of Edinburgh
20th-century Jordanian lawyers
Academic staff of the University of Jordan
Justice ministers of Jordan
Members of the Senate of Jordan
People from Amman
Higher education ministers of Jordan
COVID-19 pandemic in Jordan